Streptomyces phaeofaciens is a bacterium species from the genus of Streptomyces which has been isolated from soil. Streptomyces phaeofaciens produces phaeofacin.

Further reading

See also 
 List of Streptomyces species

References

External links
Type strain of Streptomyces phaeofaciens at BacDive -  the Bacterial Diversity Metadatabase

phaeofaciens
Bacteria described in 1957